Jesse Ray Cougle (born June 30, 1975, in New Orleans, Louisiana) is an American psychologist and associate professor of psychology at Florida State University. His laboratory studies multiple psychological disorders, including obsessive-compulsive disorder and posttraumatic stress disorder. As a graduate student, he also published multiple studies on the alleged adverse psychological effects of abortion, sometimes along with David C. Reardon and Priscilla K. Coleman.

Education and career
Cougle graduated from Lutheran High School in Springfield, Illinois in 1993. He went on to receive a B.A. in psychology from Azusa Pacific University in 1997, an M.Sc. from the Oxford University in 2001, and a Ph.D. from the University of Texas at Austin in 2008. He joined Florida State as an assistant professor of psychology in 2008, and became an associate professor there in 2015.

References

1975 births
Living people
Florida State University faculty
University of Texas at Austin College of Liberal Arts alumni
People from New Orleans
Azusa Pacific University alumni
Alumni of the University of Oxford
21st-century American psychologists